The following units and commanders fought in the Bristoe campaign of the American Civil War on the Union side. The Confederate order of battle is shown separately. When multiple names of commanders are shown, this indicates the succession of command through the Campaign.

Military rank abbreviations used 
 MG = Major General
 BG = Brigadier General
 Col = Colonel
 Ltc = Lieutenant Colonel
 Maj = Major
 Cpt = Captain
 Lt = Lieutenant

Army of the Potomac 
MG George G. Meade, Commanding

General Staff and Headquarters 

General Staff and Headquarters
 Chief of Staff: MG Andrew A. Humphreys
 Chief of Artillery: BG Henry J. Hunt
 Assistant Adjutant General: BG Seth Williams
 Chief Quartermaster: BG Rufus Ingalls
 Provost Marshal General: BG Marsena R. Patrick 
 80th New York (20th Militia): Ltc Jacob B. Hardenbergh
 93rd New York: Ltc Benjamin C. Butler
 2nd Pennsylvania Cavalry: Ltc Joseph B. Printon 
 6th Pennsylvania Cavalry (detachment)
 Detachments Regular Cavalry and Volunteer Cavalry
 Engineer Brigade: BG Henry W. Benham
 15th New York (battalion): Capt Joseph Wood Jr. 
 50th New York: Col William H. Pettes
 U.S. Battalion: Capt George H. Mendell
 Guards and Orderlies
 Oneida (New York) Cavalry: Capt Daniel P. Mann
 Signal Corps: Capt Lemuel B. Norton

I Corps 
 MG John Newton  
 Escort: 4th and 16th Pennsylvania Cavalry (detachments)

II Corps 
 MG Gouverneur K. Warren (temporarily absent; returned October 12)
 BG John C. Caldwell
 Escort:
 10th New York Cavalry, Company M: Lt James Matthews
 13th Pennsylvania Cavalry, Company G: Lt Robert Brown

III Corps 
 MG William H. French

V Corps 
 MG George Sykes
 Escort: 5th Michigan Cavalry (squadron): Lt Samuel Harris
 Provost Guard: 12th New York (Companies D and E): Cpt Henry W. Ryder

VI Corps 
 MG John Sedgwick
 Escort: 1st Vermont Cavalry (detachment): Capt Andrew J. Grover

Cavalry Corps 
 MG Alfred Pleasonton
 Headquarters Guard: 6th US: Maj Robert M. Morris

Artillery Reserve 
 BG Robert O. Tyler

References 
 U.S. War Department, The War of the Rebellion: a Compilation of the Official Records of the Union and Confederate Armies], U.S. Government Printing Office, 1880–1901.

American Civil War orders of battle